Repušnica is a village in central Croatia located west of Kutina. The population is 1,838 (census 2011).

References

Populated places in Sisak-Moslavina County
Kutina